Kerasotes Showplace Theatres, LLC is a movie theatre operator in the United States. Based in Chicago, Kerasotes Showplace Theatres, LLC was the sixth-largest movie-theatre company in North America with 957 screens in 95 locations in California, Colorado, Illinois, Indiana, Iowa, Ohio, Minnesota, Missouri, New Jersey, and Wisconsin.

The company was founded in 1909, when Gus Kerasotes, a Greek immigrant, opened a storefront nickelodeon movie theatre in Springfield, Illinois. He and his brother, Louis G. Kerasotes, operated the theater business together for over fifty years.  His four sons, George, Louis, John, and Nicholas, joined him in the business and by the 1930s, the company had one theatre.

The chain undertook a major expansion program during the 1990s and 2000s adding several hundred screens to the circuit.   

In January 2008, Kerasotes acquired AGT Enterprise's Star Cinema brand.  The purchase included four theatres in Wisconsin and two in Iowa, which retained the Star Cinema name.

On November 20, 2009, Kerasotes opened the first theater in its newly-created premium theater brand, Showplace ICON, in Minnesota. It would soon be followed by a second location in Chicago the following month. 

On Tuesday, January 19, 2010, Kerasotes Showplace Theatres, LLC announced that they signed a definitive agreement to sell most of the assets to AMC Entertainment, Inc., combining the nation's second and sixth largest movie theatre chains.

On Tuesday, May 25, 2010, the $275 million sale between Kerasotes Theatres and AMC Entertainment, Inc. was completed.

Kerasotes Showplace Theatres is currently managed by the third generation of the founding family with Tony Kerasotes as chief executive officer and Dean Kerasotes as chief operating officer.  It operates six theaters located in the Seaport District in Boston, Chicago's South Loop, the Minneapolis suburb of St. Louis Park, Mountain View, California, San Jose, California in the Valley Fair mall, and in the Harmon Meadow development in Secaucus, New Jersey. Only the latter operates under the Showplace Theater branding; the remaining five are marketed as Showplace Icon theaters.

References

External links
 

Movie theatre chains in the United States
Companies based in Chicago
Springfield, Illinois
Private equity portfolio companies
Providence Equity Partners companies
AMC Theatres
American companies established in 1909
Entertainment companies established in 1909
2010 mergers and acquisitions